The Turkish Basketball Presidential Cup Final MVP is an award that is given to the most outstanding player in the Final of the Turkish Basketball Presidential Cup. The award is handed out since 2016.

Winners

 There were no Presidential Cup games in the 2019–20 and 2020–21 seasons, because the season was cancelled due to the coronavirus pandemic in Turkey.

Awards won by nationality

Awards won by club

References

External links 
 Turkish Basketball Federation official website 

Basketball most valuable player awards
Turkish Basketball President's Cup